International Longshoremen's Association, AFL-CIO v. Allied International, Inc., 456 U.S. 212 (1982), was a United States Supreme Court case which held that a trade union that refused to unload cargo from the Soviet Union in protest against the invasion of Afghanistan had engaged in a secondary boycott, an unfair labor practice under the National Labor Relations Act.

Background 
Allied International was an importer of wood products from the Soviet Union and had contracts with a shipping firm to bring the products to the United States. The shipping company in turn contracted a stevedoring company to unload the cargo, whose workers were members of the International Longshoremen's Association (ILA).  In 1980, following the Soviet invasion of Afghanistan, the ILA had resolved not to load or unload Soviet cargo destined for US ports. As a result of this boycott, Allied's shipping was disrupted and the company had to renegotiate its contracts. Allied International sued the union.

Opinion of the Court 
Justice Powell rejected the ILA's defense, noting; ''as understandable and even commendable as the ILA's ultimate objectives may be, the certain effect of its action is to impose a heavy burden on neutral employers. It is just such a burden, as well as widening of industrial strife, that the secondary boycott provisions were designed to prevent.''  The Court argued that while ILA claimed to be boycotting the Soviet Union, it was in effect boycotting a third party (the employer).  The Court viewed the boycott as a political act, rather than economic.  It dismissed claims that of First Amendment protection, as the petition clause relates to expression towards domestic government, not foreign.

Subsequent developments 
John Rubin, writing on the significance of the case, noted:

Julius Getman, writing at the time as Professor of Law at Yale University, noted the incongruity in the Court's reasoning between this case and NAACP v. Claiborne Hardware Co., which upheld the right to engage in boycotts:

References

External links
 

1982 in United States case law
United States Supreme Court cases
United States Supreme Court cases of the Burger Court
United States lawsuits
International Longshoremen's Association
United States labor case law